The name Wukong has been used to name four tropical cyclones in the Western Pacific Ocean. The name was submitted by China and refers to Sun Wukong, a character in a Chinese epic.

 Typhoon Wukong (2000) (T0016, 23W, Maring) – affected Hainan and Indochina.
 Tropical Storm Wukong (2006) (T0610, 11W) – impacted southern Japan.
 Tropical Storm Wukong (2012) (T1225, 27W, Quinta) – traversed the Philippines, causing flash flooding.
 Tropical Storm Wukong (2018) (T1811, 14W) – churned in the open ocean.

Pacific typhoon set index articles